
Larsen may refer to:

People
 Larsen (surname)

Geography
 Larsen Bay, in Alaska, United States
 Larsen Channel, in Antarctica
 Larsen Ice Shelf, in Antarctica
 Larsen Islands, in Antarctica
 Cape Larsen and Larsen Bay in American Samoa

Other
 "Larsen", song by Zazie
 Larsen effect, special kind of feedback which occurs when a loop exists between an audio input and an audio output
 Larsen syndrome, a rare congenital disorder of affecting joints and facial features
 Larsen & Toubro, an Indian engineering and construction conglomerate

See also
 Larson (disambiguation)
 Larsson

Distinguish from
 Larceny, a form of theft